The Tuileries Palace was a royal and imperial palace in Paris which stood on the right bank of the River Seine, directly in front of the Louvre. It was the usual Parisian residence of most French monarchs, from Henry IV to Napoleon III, until it was burned by the Paris Commune in 1871.

Built in 1564, it was gradually extended until it closed off the western end of the Louvre courtyard and displayed an immense façade of 266 metres. Since the destruction of the Tuileries, the Louvre courtyard has remained open and the site is now the location of the eastern end of the Tuileries Garden, forming an elevated terrace between the Place du Carrousel and the gardens proper.

History

Plan of Catherine de Medici (16th C.) 

The site of the Tuileries palace was originally just outside the walls of the city, in an area frequently flooded by the Seine as far as the present Rue Saint-Honore. The land was occupied by the workshops and kilns craftsmen who made "tuiles", or roof tiles. Because of its proximity to the Louvre Palace, members of the royal family began buying plots of land there.

After the accidental death of Henry II of France in 1559, his widow Catherine de' Medici (1519–1589) moved into the Louvre Palace with her son, the new king, Francois II, but planned a new residence for herself, close to the Louvre and having space for a large garden. She sold the medieval Hôtel des Tournelles, near the Bastille, where her husband had died, and between 1563 and 1568 acquired several pieces of land which she put together for her new residence. She began building in 1564, with a plan of Philibert de l'Orme, known for his work at the Palace of Fontainebleau, the Château d'Anet and Château de Saint-Germain-en-Laye. The work began in 1564, but de l'Orme died in 1570, when the work was still in its early stages. His place was taken by Jean Bullant, whose works included the gallery of the Château de Chenonceau in the Loire Valley. The outbreak of the civil between Protestants and Catholics in Paris in 1588 abruptly halted the work. The site, outside the city walls was abandoned and pillaged.

Additions of Henry IV
Work did not resume until 1594, when Henry IV of France made a triumphal return to Paris, and recommenced construction of the Louvre and the Tuileries Palace. He constructed the Grande Galerie, parallel to the Seine, which connected the two palaces. At the same time, Henry commissioned the landscape gardener Claude Mollet to modify the plan of the gardens. The architects and decorators Etienne Duperac, Louis Metezeau and Jacques II Androuet du Cerceau contributed to the new palace.

The Grand Gallery and the Gros Pavilion des Tuileries, now called the Pavillon de Flore),the tower by Androuet du Cerceau which linked the Louvre and the Tuileries palaces, was completed, but between 1864 and 1868, under Napoleon III, the original pavilion was redesigned and rebuilt by Hector Lefuel, to match the other modifications to the palaces.

Louis XIV and Louis XV - enlargement and departure (17th-18th Century) 

After the death of Henry IV of France in 1610, work on the palace halted and his son Louis XIII of France had no intention of expanding it or continuing construction. It did not resume until after the Fronde (1648–53), a broad rebellion by the nobility, the Parliament and the Parisians against Louis XIV's royal authority. Between 1659 and 1661, the king and Cardinal Mazarin had First Royal Architect Louis Le Vau enlarge the palace, extending it to the north by the addition of the Théâtre des Tuileries.

In 1662 Louis celebrated the birth of the Dauphin, his son and heir, with a spectacular "Carrousel", which took place in the courtyard on the east side of the palace. A pageant on horseback, with dressage and other equestrian exercises with over seven hundred horsemen participating, it offered a variety tournaments and competitions, including a contest to spear the cardboard heads of "Saracens" and "Moors", and mounted processions to music around the courtyard. The King took part, wearing the costume of a Roman emperor. The courtyard thereafter was known and still is known as the "Carrousel".

From 1664 to 1666 Le Vau and his assistant François d'Orbay made other significant changes. They transformed Philibert de l'Orme's facades and central pavilion, replacing its grand central staircase with a colonnaded vestibule on the ground floor and the Salle des Cents Suisses (Hall of the Hundred Swiss Guards) on the floor above and adding a rectangular dome. A new grand staircase was installed in the entrance of the north wing of the palace, and lavishly decorated royal apartments were constructed in the south wing. The king's rooms were on the ground floor, facing toward the Louvre, and the queen's on the floor above, overlooking the garden. At the same time, Louis' gardener, André Le Nôtre, redesigned the Tuileries Garden.

Louis XIV fully used his redecorated and enlarged palace only for a short time. The Court moved into the Tuileries Palace in November 1667, but left in 1672, and soon thereafter settled in the Palace of Versailles. The Tuileries Palace was virtually abandoned and used only as a theatre, but its gardens became a fashionable resort of Parisians.

Following the death of Louis XIV in December, 1715, his great-grandson, Louis XV, just five years old, was moved from Versailles to the Tuileries Palace on 1 January 1716. He moved back to Versailles on 15 June 1722, three months before his coronation. Both moves were made at the behest of the Regent, the duc d'Orléans. The king also resided at the Tuileries for short periods during the 1740s. The palace had been rarely used in forty years; it was refurnished and redecorated for the new King, but he remained only until 1722, when he also moved to Versailles. The large palace theater continued to be used as a venue for operas, concerts and performances of the Comédie-Française.

Louis XVI - Royal sanctuary and revolutionary battleground 

On December 1, 1783, the palace garden was the starting point of an event in aviation history, the first manned flight in a hydrogen balloon, by Jacques Charles and the Robert brothers. It was just two months after the first manned balloon flight by the Montgolfier brothers in a hot air balloon from the Palace of Versailles. King Louis XVI watched from the tower. Among the crowd of spectators was Benjamin Franklin, seventy-seven years old, the United States ambassador to France. The balloon and passengers landed safely at Nesles-la-Vallée, thirty-one miles from Paris.

Not long afterwards, on 6 October 1789, the gardens were the site of a revolutionary event of a different kind. Louis XVI and his family were forced to leave Versailles, to return to Paris and to move into the Tuileries. Nothing had been prepared for their arrival; the various occupants who had moved into the Palace were abruptly expelled, and furniture had to be brought from Versailles. The royal family lived in relative calm for a time; the gardens were reserved for them until noon, when they were opened to the public.

On 9 November 1789, the National Constituent Assembly, formerly the Estates-General of 1789, moved its meetings from the tennis court at Versailles to the Salle du Manège. This was the Tuileries' covered equestrian academy, on the north side of the palace, which was the largest meeting hall in the city. It was also used by the Assembly's successor, the National Convention and, in 1795, the Council of Five Hundred (Conseil des Cinq-Cents) of the Directoire until the body moved to the Palais-Bourbon in 1798. In 1799, the Jacobin Club du Manège had its headquarters there. The Committee of Public Safety, led by Robespierre, met in the Pavillon de Flore, which connected the Palace to the Louvre.

On June 21, 1791, as the Revolution intensified, the King and his family attempted to escape. That night they attended a final Vespers mass in the palace chapel, and then, disguised and with their attendants, attempted by coach to reach the Austrian border. They were recognised and arrested at Varennes, brought back to Paris, and placed under house arrest.

On August 10, 1792, a large mob stormed the palace gates, entered the gardens, and overwhelmed and massacred the Swiss Guards who defended the Palace. They set fires in several of the outlying buildings of the Palace. Vestiges of buildings destroyed by the fires were discovered during archaeological excavations in 1989. After the massacre of the Swiss Guards, the palace itself was taken over by the Sans-Culottes. In November 1792, the invaders discovered the Armoire de fer, a hiding place at the royal apartments, believed to contain the secret correspondence of Louis XVI with other European monarchs, appealing for help. This increased anger against the imprisoned King and Queen. The National Convention, meeting in the Manege of the Palace, launched the Reign of Terror in 1793–94, leading to the execution of the King and Queen and thousands of others accused of opposing the Revolution.

Napoleon in the Tuileries 

On February 19, 1799, Napoleon Bonaparte, the new First Consul and soon to become Emperor of the French, moved his official residence to the Tuileries Palace, a more suitable setting for his imperial ambitions. He began redecorating the interior in the Neoclassical Empire style by Percier and Fontaine. He also began a series of reconstructions around the Palace, tearing down the ruins of buildings burned during the Revolution, in 1806, In the center of the courtyard of the Carousel, he had constructed a triumphal arch, modelled after the ancient Arch of Septimius Severus in Rome, to serve as the ceremonial gateway of the palace. In 1808, after he became Emperor, He moved forward with the grand project of Henry IV, to build a new wing of the Palace on the north side of the gardens, matching the wing on the south side along the river, to connect the Tuileries it with the Louvre. This involved tearing down the Manage and other buildings to clear the courtyard, and the construction a new street, the Rue de Rivoli, named for his victory at the Battle of Rivoli in 1797.

After Napoléon's divorce, Pierre Paul Prud'hon was commissioned to design the apartments of his new wife, Marie-Louise. For the bridal suite of the new Empress he designed all the furniture and interior decorations in a Greek Revival style. The son of Napoleon and Marie-Louise, King of Rome, born in 1811, was given his residence in the Waterside Gallery of the Louvre, connected to the Tuileries by a short underground passageway, and his own small pavilion in the courtyard, decorated by Fontaine.

Palace of Louis Philippe and Louis Napoleon 

Following the defeat and exile of Napoleon, the gardens became a large camp for Russian and Prussian soldiers, while the Kings of France returned to the palace during the Bourbon Restoration. During the July Revolution of 1830, which installed Louis Philippe as the new monarch, the Tuileries was again stormed and occupied by an armed mob. This time the Swiss Guards of the King, rather than remaining to be massacred, quietly departed their posts. King Louis Philippe I occupied the palace until 1848, when it was again briefly invaded, and the King chased out.

Louis-Napoléon Bonaparte the nephew of Napoleon, was elected the first President of France in 1848, and occupied the Elysée Palace. In 1852, when he could not run again, he seized power, and moved his residence to the Tuileries. The Tuileries was extensively refurbished and redecorated after the looting and damage that had occurred during the Revolution of 1848. Imposing state rooms were designed and richly decorated in what became known as the Second Empire style. The prominent roof-lines of the palace, and especially its squared central dome, became influential prototypes, adopted for hotels and commercial buildings as well as government buildings and residences in France and abroad. The new state rooms were theatrical settings for the ceremonies and pageantry of the Second Empire, such as the visit of Queen Victoria in 1855. The old buildings that had filled the courtyard were cleared away; and Napoleon III completed the northern wing of the Louvre along the rue de Rivoli, linking the Tuileries Palace with the Louvre, following the grand plan of Henry IV three centuries earlier.

The private apartment used by Napoleon III, on the ground floor of the southern wing of the palace, consisted of "overheated gilt boxes furnished in the style of the First Empire", being kept at "an excessively high temperature" by the emperor. Empress Eugénie had her apartment above, connected to the emperor's by a winding staircase, with a mezzanine occupied by the treasurer of the privy purse in between, and comprising eight of the eleven rooms on the bel etage of the southern wing's garden side. This arrangement at the Tuileries was unlike at Versailles, where the apartments of monarch and consort were both on the same floor and the king's was the grander of the two.

The state rooms – on the Carrousel, or east, side – of the south wing were used variously depending on the occasion. If it were an informal dinner, the household would gather in the Private Drawing Room, or Salon d'Apollon, which was separated from the Salle de Maréchaux, in the central pavilion, by the First Consul's Room, or Salon Blanc. The party would proceed through the throne room to dinner in the Salon Louis XIV. However, gala dinners were held in the larger Galerie de Diane, the southernmost of the state apartments. If it were a state ball, then refreshments would be set up in the Galerie; and the procession of the imperial party would be from there to the Salle de Maréchaux, which occupied the space of two entire floors of the central Pavillon de L'Horloge and served as the ballroom.

The little-used northern wing of the palace, which contained the chapel, Galerie de la Paix, and the Salle de Spectacle would be called into service only for performances, such as the Auber cantata performed the evening of Napoleon and Eugénie's civil wedding ceremony, 29 July 1853, or for the most important fêtes, such as the party given for sovereigns attending the International Exposition, on 10 June 1867. The Salle de Spectacle was also used as a hospital during the Franco-Prussian War.

The southernmost pavilion, the Pavillon de Flore, served as the backstairs to the palace. Service corridors led to it. One could get from there to the sprawling basement, lit with innumerable gas lamps, where a railway had been set up to bring food from the kitchens under the Rue de Rivoli.

Destruction during the Paris Commune 

On 23 May 1871, during the suppression of the Paris Commune, twelve men under the orders of Jules Bergeret, the former chief military commander of the Commune, set the Tuileries on fire at 7 p.m., using petroleum, liquid tar and turpentine. The fire lasted 48 hours and thoroughly gutted the palace, except for the southernmost part, the Pavillon de Flore (the gate of honor, the Arc de Triomphe du Carrousel, also remains, as well as the foundation). The dome itself was blown up by explosives placed in the central pavilion and detonated by the converging fires. Observing this, Bergeret sent a note to the Committee of Public Safety: 'The last vestiges of Royalty have just disappeared. I wish that the same may befall all the public buildings of Paris' It was only on 25 May that the Paris fire brigades and the 26th battalion of the Chasseurs d'Afrique managed to put out the fire. The library and other portions of the Louvre were also set on fire by Communards and entirely destroyed. The museum itself was saved by the efforts of the firemen.

The ruins of the Tuileries stood on the site for 11 years. Although the roofs and the inside of the palace had been utterly destroyed by the fire, the stone walls of the palace remained intact and restoration was possible. Other monuments of Paris also set on fire by Communards, such as the City Hall, were rebuilt in the 1870s. After much hesitation, the Third Republic, more sympathetic to the Commune, pardoned the Commune members exiled abroad and in 1882, despite opposition from Baron Haussmann and historians, had the walls torn down.

The demolition was started in February 1883 and completed on 30 September 1883. The courtyard pediment of the central pavilion can be seen in Paris' , Other pieces are found in the garden of the Palais du Trocadéro, the Louvre and the Museum of Decorative Arts.

The Tuileries Garden and the Axe historique

Tuileries Garden

The Galerie nationale du Jeu de Paume is a museum of contemporary art located in the northwest corner of the garden.

Originally designed in 1564 as an Italian Renaissance garden by Bernard de Carnesse, the Tuileries Garden was redesigned in 1664 by Le Nôtre as a jardin à la française, which emphasized symmetry, order, and long perspectives. His formal garden plan drew out the perspective from the reflecting pools one to the other in an unbroken vista along a central axis from the west palace façade, which has been extended as the Axe historique.

The Axe historique
This straight line which runs through the Place de la Concorde and the Arc de Triomphe to La Défense was originally centred on the façade of the Tuileries, a similar line leading across the entrance court of the Louvre. As the two façades were placed at slightly differing angles, this has resulted in a slight 'kink' on the site of the palace, a feature ultimately dictated by the curved course of the River Seine.

After the palace was demolished in 1883, the large empty space between the northern and southern wings of the Louvre, now familiar to modern visitors, was revealed, and for the first time the Louvre courtyard opened onto the unbroken Axe historique.

Proposed reconstruction

In 2003, a group called the Committee for the Reconstruction of the Tuileries proposed the reconstruction of the Tuileries on its original site.
Proponents of the plan noted that much of the original furniture and paintings still existed, put into storage when the Franco-Prussian War began in 1870.

In 2006 a rebuilding of the Palace of the Tuileries was estimated to cost 300 million euros (£200 million pounds sterling or US$380 million). The plan was to finance the project by public subscription with the work being undertaken by a private foundation, with the French government spending no money on the project. The French president at that time, Jacques Chirac, called for a debate on the subject. Former president Charles de Gaulle had also supported reconstruction, saying that it would "make a jewel of the centre of Paris."

However, in 2008, Michel Clément, Director of Architecture and Heritage, stated "From our point of view, the reconstruction of the Tuileries Palace is not a priority. In addition, it is not part of French heritage culture to resurrect monuments out of the ground ex nihilo. Rather, we are concerned with the vestiges that have survived."

Gallery

See also

 Pavillon de Flore

Sources and Citations

Bibliography
 Ballon, Hilary (1991). The Paris of Henri IV: Architecture and Urbanism. Cambridge, Massachusetts: The MIT Press. .
 Coeyman, Barbara (1998). "Opera and Ballet in Seventeenth-Century French Theatres: Case Studies of the Salle des Machines and the Palais Royal Theater" in Radice 1998, pp. 37–71.
 Devêche, André (1981). The Tuileries Palace and Gardens, translated by Jonathan Eden. Paris: Éditions de la Tourelle-Maloine. .
 Hautecoeur, Louis (1927). L'Histoire des Chateaux du Louvre et des Tuileries. Paris: G. Van Oest. .
 Jacquin, Emmanuel (2000), Les Tuileries, Du Louvre à la Concorde, Editions du Patrimoine, Centres des Monuments Nationaux, Paris. .
 Radice, Mark A., editor (1998). Opera in Context: Essays on Historical Staging from the Late Renaissance to the Time of Puccini. Portland, Oregon: Amadeus Press. .

External links

 National Committee for the rebuilding of the Tuileries Palace 
 Rebuilding the Tuileries by Charles T. Downey (Ionarts, 17 August 2006)
 Project for Reconstruction of the Tuileries Palace: 13th Legislature, 2008 Senate question 
 Photos of the gardens of the Tuileries
 Interior and exterior photos, as well as plan of the state floor, of the Second Empire period

Houses completed in the 19th century
Renaissance architecture in France
Châteaux with Renaissance gardens in France
Buildings and structures in the 1st arrondissement of Paris
Demolished buildings and structures in France
Demolished buildings and structures in Paris
Former buildings and structures in Paris
Parks and open spaces in Paris
Palaces and residences of Napoleon
Palaces in France
Royal residences in France
Imperial residences in France
French Revolution
Buildings and structures demolished in 1883

pl:Tuileries